Luče (sometimes Luče ob Savinji) is the largest settlement and the centre of the Municipality of Luče in northern Slovenia. It belongs to the traditional region of Styria and is now included in the Savinja Statistical Region.

Geography
Luče is home to Snow Cave on Mount Raduha, which is the highest-elevation tourist cave in Slovenia.

Church
The parish church in the settlement is dedicated to Saint Lawrence and belongs to the Roman Catholic Diocese of Celje. It was first mentioned in written documents dating to 1423 and has some 17th-century alterations to the original building.

References

External links

Luče on Geopedia

Populated places in the Municipality of Luče